Luganville Seaplane Base is a former World War II seaplane base in the Segond Channel between the islands of Espiritu Santo and Aore Island in the New Hebrides Islands at the Espiritu Santo Naval Base.

History

World War II
The first bases on Espiritu Santo were established by the United States as defensive bases to guard the existing facility at Efate and to support the Solomon Islands Campaign, however its strategic location led to its expansion into one of the largest advance bases in the South Pacific.
The 7th Naval Construction Battalion arrived on Santo on 11 August 1942 and began construction of more extensive air facilities to support the Guadalcanal Campaign. The 7th Battalion constructed a parking area, two pre-fabricated  by  nose hangars, warehouses, quonset huts and two seaplane ramps at Belchif Point on the Segond Channel between the Renee and Sarakata Rivers. The 57th Naval Construction Battalion later built two seaplane drydocks at the base.

United States Navy units based at the base included:
VP-11 11 August 1942 – 1 February 1943
VP-12 14 June-30 July 1944
VP-14 1 September-10 December 1943
VP-23 15 July-1 October 1942 and 24 June-20 August 1943
VP-24 1 February-29 September 1943
VP-54 1 August-10 November 1944
VP-72 4 September 1942 - 6 July 1943
VP-91 4 September 1942 - March 1943

all operating PBYs.

US Navy ships supporting seaplane operations included:
  11 August 1942 – 9 July 1943.
  August–November 1942
  28 February-12 August 1943
  October 1945

Royal New Zealand Air Force units operating from the base included:
No. 5 Squadron operating PBYs from 10 November 1944
No. 6 Squadron operating PBYs from November 1943

Postwar
NOB Espiritu Santo disestablished on 12 June 1946. The base's onshore facilities are now overgrown and are under private ownership. Erosion caused by Cyclone Harold in April 2020 revealed details of the layout of the base, including exposing one of the seaplane ramps.

See also
Luganville Airfield
Palikulo Bay Airfield
Santo-Pekoa International Airport
Turtle Bay Airfield
Seabees

References

World War II airfields in the Pacific Ocean Theater
Seaplane bases
Espiritu Santo
Airfields of the United States Navy
Military installations closed in 1945
1942 establishments in the New Hebrides
1945 disestablishments in Oceania
Closed installations of the United States Navy